Pedro Ignacio Wolcan Olano is from June 19, 2018 the bishop of Tacuarembó.

Biography 

Pedro Wolcan was born in Nueva Helvecia in 1953, and studied in the interdiocesan major seminary of Montevideo and was ordained priest on September 21, 1986, being incardinated in the diocese of Mercedes.

From 1986 to 1991 he was priest of the cathedral. In 2005 he became parish priest of Santísima Trinidad and, in 2006, parish priest of Nuestra Señora del Carmen.

Since 2015 he was vicar general of the diocese. On June 19, 2018 he was nominated bishop of Tacuarembó. He was ordained bishop in the Cathedral of Tacuarembó on the following 12 August by bishop Carlos María Collazzi Irazábal.

References

1953 births
Living people
People from Nueva Helvecia
Bishops appointed by Pope Francis
Uruguayan Roman Catholic bishops
Roman Catholic bishops of Tacuarembó